This is a list of castles in the ceremonial county of Somerset, England. The first castles - private fortified residences of a lord or noble - were built in Somerset following the Norman Conquest of England, although earlier fortified structures, such as burhs or hill forts, of which there are many in Somerset were sometimes historically described as castles. In the aftermath of his victory at the Battle of Hastings in 1066, William the Conqueror entrusted the conquest of the south-west of England to his half-brother Robert of Mortain. Anticipating stiff resistance, Robert marched west into Somerset, supported by forces under Walter of Douai, who entered from the north; a third force, under the command of William de Moyon, probably landed by sea along the Somerset coast. These lords defended the coastline and the north and east of the county with a range of castles, including Neroche, Montacute and Dunster. The castles were carefully positioned to control key settlements, rivers and roads, and were constructed from timber, using either motte-and-bailey or ringwork designs. Rebellions soon broke out across the south-west, and Montacute was placed under siege in 1069. By the turn of the 12th century, however, many of the smaller castles built in the post-conquest years had already been abandoned.

During the civil war years of the Anarchy in the mid-12th century, during which the rival Anglo-Norman factions of King Stephen and the Empress Matilda vied for power, new motte-and-bailey castles such as Bury and probably Fenny, were erected to provide additional defences, some castles like Neroche that had previously been in decline were temporarily pressed back into service, and a number, including Cary and Richmont saw sieges. Between the 12th and 14th centuries many Somerset castles, such as Cary, Fenny, Montacute fell out of use. In the 14th century, the castles being built in Somerset, such as Nunney and Farleigh Hungerford, were impressive dwellings, but built more for show than for military defence. These typically took an enclosure style with quadrangular sides, corner towers and courtyards, as at Newton St Loe. Gatehouses became popular features in the 15th century, often used as fashionable residences, such as at Dunster Castle.

In 1642, civil war broke out in England between the Royalist supporters of Charles I and the supporters of Parliament. Somerset was predominantly Royalist in sympathy, and several castles were returned to military service during the conflict, including Taunton and Dunster. After the war, Parliament ordered various castles in the region to be deliberately damaged - slighted - including Bridgwater, Dunster and Taunton. Architectural fashions changed in England, and by the 18th century some castles had been redeveloped as grand houses, their grounds reused to hold new mansions, as at Storgursey, while the ruins of Newton St Loes were used as romantic curiosities. As the century progressed, sites such as Bridgwater were redeveloped altogether and the remains of the castles destroyed. In the late 19th century and early 20th century. Somerset's castles were protected by a variety of legislation, eventually as scheduled monuments and listed buildings. Castles under state control through the Ministry of Works were transferred to the heritage agency English Heritage in 1983, who now run Nunney, and Farleigh Hungerford Castles, and the National Trust acquired Dunster in 1976. Other castles have found alternative uses, such as Storgursey, renovated by the Landmark Trust between 1981 and 1982 for use as a holiday property.

Castles

See also
Castles in Great Britain and Ireland
List of castles in England
List of hill forts and ancient settlements in Somerset

References

Bibliography

Brown, G. (2008) Richmont Castle, East Harptree: An Analytical Earthwork Survey, English Heritage Research Department Report No. 73. London: English Heritage.

Emery, Anthony. (2006) Greater Medieval Houses of England and Wales, 1300–1500: Southern England. Cambridge: Cambridge University Press. .

Landmark Trust. (2006) The Landmark Trust Handbook. Maidenhead, UK: The Landmark Trust. .
Liddiard, Robert. (2005) Castles in Context: Power, Symbolism and Landscape, 1066 to 1500. Macclesfield, UK: Windgather Press. .
Mackenzie, J.D. (1896) Castles of England. New York: Macmillan.
Pettifer, Adrian. (2002) English Castles: a Guide by Counties. Woodbridge, UK: Boydell Press. .
Pevsner, Nikolaus. (1958) North Somerset and Bristol. London: Penguin Books. OCLC 459446734.
Prior, Stuart. (2006) The Norman Art of War: a Few Well-Positioned Castles. Stroud, UK: Tempus. .
Rigold, Stuart. (1975) Nunney Castle: Somerset. London: HMSO. .

Youngs, Susan M. and John Clark. (1981) "Medieval Britain in 1980," Medieval Archaeology 25,

History of Somerset
Castles in Somerset
Somerset
Castles